William Dicks (born 16 September 1930) is a former  Australian rules footballer who played with St Kilda in the Victorian Football League (VFL).

Dicks played with the Corowa Football Club in the Ovens and Murray Football League in 1953 and 1954, winning Corowa's best and fairest award in 1954.

Dicks was runner up in the 1954 Ovens and Murray Football League best and fairest award, the Morris Medal.

Dicks then moved across to Yarrawonga Football Club in 1955 as captain / coach  where they lost the Preliminary Final to Wangaratta Football Club in 1955.

Notes

External links 

Living people
1930 births
Australian rules footballers from Victoria (Australia)
St Kilda Football Club players